Bahrain will participate in the 2011 Asian Winter Games in Almaty and Astana, Kazakhstan from January 30, 2011 to February 6, 2011. This marks Bahrain's debut at a major winter sporting event.

Ice hockey

Men
The Bahrain men's Ice hockey team will make its debut at an international competition. The team is in the premier division for these games. The team lost all six games and finished in 12th and last place.

Premier Division

All times are local (UTC+6).

References

Nations at the 2011 Asian Winter Games
Asian Winter Games
Bahrain at the Asian Winter Games